The Mondial Piega 1000 is an exotic, limited production Italian sport bike made by Mondial. The engine is from Honda, the same V-twin used on the VTR-1000 SP-1.

Specifications

All specifications are for the Mondial Piega, manufacturer claimed and estimated. Differences for the Evolution model are shown after a double slash, i.e. //

Engine
 Type: Liquid-cooled, four-stroke 90° V-Twin DOHC, 4 valves/cylinder
 Capacity: 999 cc
 Bore/Stroke: 
 Compression ratio: 10.8:1
 Fuel system: Electronic Fuel Injection
 Ignition: Mondial Software Control Unit

Transmission
 Primary Drive: Gear
 Final Drive: Chain
 Clutch: Wet, Multi-plate
 Gearbox: 6-speed

Cycle parts
 Frame: Tubular chromium-molybdenum-vanadium steel trellis; Öhlins steering damper
 Swingarm: Tubular chromium-molybdenum-vanadium steel trellis wrapped in carbon-fiber
 Front wheel: // Evo: Marchesini
 Rear wheel: // Evo: Marchesini
 Front tyre: 120/70 ZR 17
 Rear tyre: 180/50 ZR 17 // Evo: 180/55 ZR 17
 Front suspension: Paioli 46 mm TiN upside down forks // Evo: Öhlins 43 mm TiN upside-down forks
 Rear suspension: Öhlins
 Front brakes: Brembo dual 310 mm discs with 4-piston calipers // Evo: dual 320 mm discs with 4 piston Radial Calipers
 Rear brakes: single 200 mm disc with 2-piston calipers // Evo: single 220 mm

Dimensions
 Length: ? mm (? in): // Evo: 2000 mm (78.7 in)
 Width (w/mirrors): // Evo: 990 mm (39 in)
 Height: ? mm (in)
 Seat height: 820 mm (32.3 in)
 Wheelbase: 1398 mm (55 in) // Evo: 1420 mm (55.9 in)
 Rake: // Evo: 26°
 Trail:
 Weight (dry): 179 kg // Evo: 178 kg
 Fuel Tank capacity: 20 L (reserve 3 L) // Evo: 18 L (reserve 3.8 L)

Performance 
(measured at crankshaft)
 Maximum Power: 101.4 kW (136 bhp) @ 9,500 rpm // Evo: 104.4 kW (140 bhp) @ 9,800 rpm
 Maximum Torque: 110 Nm (81.1 ft·lbf) @ 8,500 rpm // Evo: 100 Nm (73.8 ft·lbf) @ 8,000 rpm

External links
 Mondial Moto Infosite

Piega
Sport bikes
Motorcycles introduced in 2002